Lilapur is a village in Surendranagar district, Gujarat, India.

Lilapur is the village located at Lakhtar Taluka, District - Surendranagar, Gujarat, India. The territory lies into the area as per the older Royal state name. 

Population would be about 3000-4000 people. Lilapur village is very famous for the temple of "Maa Tulja Bhavani" located inside the village. The event of the Navtatri festival is celebrated into the entire village with too much reverence, under the boon of Maa Tulja Bhavani and Maa Bahucharaji. The grand celebration completed its 100 years in Oct ' 2011. People of the village live with the brotherhood that is the examplary situation in this era. Moreover the population is covered by the castes like Patels, Brahmins, Lohanas, Shepherds, Devipujak etc. There are other temples situated too as Mahadev Mandir, Gadheki Maa Mandir, Ramji Mandir, Meldi Mata Mandir, Paanch Pir Dargah, Surdhan Dada Mandir, etc. The location is situating even a bigger Narmada Yojna Pumping station very adjacent the village. 

The people of village are mainly into the work of farming and local business. The main crops found among the area Cotton and Cumin seed. If you want to visit the village, it is 10 km away from Lakhtar. You have to travel to Lakhtar town, from there, you can find the facility of state transport buses and even private three-wheeler. The nearest railway station is Lilapur Road, 4 km away. The river passing by the village is UMIYA River. Adjacent villages are like Kesariya, Karela, Adalsar, Vana etc.

References 

Villages in Surendranagar district